Luminosity Gaming is a professional esports organization based in North America. It has teams competing in Call of Duty, Overwatch, Tom Clancy's Rainbow Six: Siege, Super Smash Bros., Fortnite, Apex Legends and Rocket League. The team was founded in Canada by Steve "Buyaka" Maida in 2015, and is based in Toronto, Ontario.

Current divisions

Apex Legends

Fortnite

Valorant

Super Smash Bros.  

In October 8th, 2016, Luminosity Gaming signed their first Super Smash Bros. for 3DS and Wii U representative being the Japanese Mewtwo player Abadango. Shortly after, they signed their first Super Smash Bros. Melee player being European Fox main Ice. Both players left shortly before the start of 2018 ending their Smash Division. This was until Melee player Ginger was signed in February of 2021.
In October 9th, 2022, they announced Maister as their first Super Smash Bros. Ultimate player.

Former divisions

Counter-Strike: Global Offensive 
On April 30, 2015, Peter "ptr" Gurney joined the team as an AWPer. On July 29 it was announced that Luminosity dropped its roster and picked up a team based in Brazil that consisted of Gabriel "FalleN" Toledo, Fernando "fer" Alvarenga, Lucas "steel" Lopes, Ricardo "boltz" Prass, and Marcelo "coldzera" David. In November 2015 Luminosity reached the quarterfinals of DreamHack Open Cluj-Napoca 2015. Luminosity won MLG Columbus 2016 on April 3, 2016. On May 8, 2016, Luminosity won DreamHack Austin where they beat fellow Brazilian team Tempo Storm 2–0 in the finals. A couple of days later on May 16, 2016, the team won the ESL Pro League Season 3 Finals after beating G2 Esports 3–2 in the finals. On June 24, 2016, it was officially announced that the Brazilian roster would be joining SK Gaming on July 1, 2016. The roster's final tournament with Luminosity was the Esports Championship Series Season 1 Finals where they placed second, losing to G2 Esports in the finals.

Luminosity signed the Brazilian team WinOut on July 30, 2016. Its roster consisted of Renato "nak" Nakano, Bruno "bit" Lima, Lucas "destinyy" Bullo, Vinicios "PKL" Coelho, Gustavo "yeL" Knittel and is coached by Alessandro "apoka" Marcucci. Renato "nak" Nakano and Bruno "bit" Lima were kicked on the team on September 8, 2016. Gustavo "SHOOWTiME" Gonçalves and Bruno "shz" Martinelli joined Luminosity on September 11.

On September 12, 2019, Luminosity dropped its second Brazilian roster.

Hearthstone 
On January 11, 2015, Luminosity picked up Stanislav Cifka, Nuno "Ignite" Pinho and Josh "Impact" Graham. On July 13, 2015, Christopher "PHONETAP" Huynh left Team Hearthlytics and joined Luminosity.

Madden NFL 17 
On October 15, 2016, Luminosity picked up Eric "Problem" Wright. Widely known as the GOAT (Greatest Of All Time) in the Madden franchise, Problem is the only 3-time winner of the Madden Challenge. No one else has won more than one. He also won Madden Nation, Season 3, which was featured on ESPN, along with numerous other tournaments.

Tom Clancy's Rainbow Six: Siege 
On June 22, 2019, Luminosity picked a Tom Clancy's Rainbow Six: Siege team that consisted of Coal "Doodle" Phillips, Kian "Hyena" Moyazani, Richie "Rexen" Coronado, Tom "Tomas" Kaka, and Muteeb "PiXeL" Chaudary. They quickly became a top team in North American Pro League defeating top teams DarkZero Esports and Team Reciprocity. Luminosity placed third in the online qualifier for the Six Major Raleigh and failed to qualify for the event. In Dreamhack Montreal 2019, Luminosity lost to Team Liquid and BDS Esport being eliminated in the group stage and placing 13-16th, alongside top European team, Chaos Esports Club and amateur teams Livid Gaming and Super Nova. After this defeat, PiXeL left the team and was replaced with former player of Rise Nation, Abdullah "Factor" Rihan. Luminosity placed 4th in North American Pro League Season 10, failing to reach the Season 10 finals but avoiding relegation.

On April 14, 2020, Hyena released a statement detailing conflict between the team, Luminosity, and the developers of Rainbow Six Siege, Ubisoft  criticizing the latter two for mismanagement and miscommunication resulting in the team's removal from Pro League. A day later, Ubisoft confirmed that the team would not be competing in Pro League. On April 17, Luminosity released Hyena along with the rest of the team. Hyena later retired from Rainbow Six Siege.

See also 
Seattle Surge
Vancouver Titans

References

External links 
 

2015 establishments in Canada
Esports teams based in Canada
Esports teams established in 2015
Call of Duty teams
Defunct and inactive Counter-Strike teams
Hearthstone teams
Defunct and inactive Overwatch teams
Smite (video game) teams
Super Smash Bros. player sponsors
World of Warcraft teams
Team Razer
Tom Clancy's Rainbow Six Siege teams
Valorant teams